Violent Playground is a black and white 1958 British film directed by Basil Dearden and starring Stanley Baker, Peter Cushing, and David McCallum. The film, which deals with the genre of juvenile delinquent, has an explicit social agenda. It owes much to U.S. films of a similar genre.

McCallum's character, in particular, references roles played by James Dean, Marlon Brando, and especially Vic Morrow in Blackboard Jungle. Rock 'n' Roll is presented as a negative influence. In a memorable scene, music appears to put the youths into a trance-like state, culminating in McCallum leading a menacing advance on Baker's character.

Many of the poor working-class subjects of the film are from Liverpool's sizeable Irish-descended community. Notably, two important characters are Chinese.

Though it was said at the time by a reviewer that "Despite its Liverpool setting not a single character speaks with a Merseyside accent in the entire film", this is not strictly true as a young Freddie Starr plays a member of the gang.

The tough inner-city estates are represented as a breeding ground for youth crime. The success rate of Liverpool's juvenile liaison officers is lauded in the prologue.

Plot
The initial scenes introduce the various miscreant young children who are to appear in the final classroom siege.

A series of arson attacks are taking place across the city, with metal laundry tags being found at each scene.

The film focuses on a Liverpool street gang led by Johnny Murphy (McCallum). When local Juvenile Liaison Officer Sergeant Truman (Baker) visits the Murphy household he becomes romantically involved with Johnny's sister (Anne Heywood). He also finds considerable points of similarity between his previous investigations into the activities of an arsonist known as the 'Firefly' and his investigation of Johnny Murphy. Cushing plays a local priest attempting to heal the social problems of the locality.

The Chinese boy Alexander (Michael Chow) is knocked down and accidentally run over by Johnny stealing and driving Alexander's and his sister Primrose's (Tsai Chin) laundry van at high speed trying to get away from the police, after being caught trying to set fire to a local hotel. Alexander is pronounced dead.

In a final sequence prescient of more recent school shootings, Murphy holds a classroom full of children hostage with a machine-gun, taunting the police on the ground below. A crowd of parents starts to gather as Johnny gets the kids to shout out their names one by one. The priest confronts Johnny. The police put a ladder to the Wall and Johnny gets young David Caplin to tell them to back off. The priest starts climbing the ladder. Johnny pushes the ladder off the building injuring the priest. In a stand off with the police Johnny shoots one of the young girl students. Cathy is sent in alone to speak to Johnny. She tells Johnny if they do not get the girl to hospital she will die. The children are released leaving just Cathy and Johnny. Johnny is arrested and Cathy feels betrayed as the police had said he would not be.

Two final children are not collected: Johnny's young twin siblings. The headmaster takes care of them.

The sergeant drives Cathy home and asks her out but she declines. She kisses his hand with gratitude.

Cast

 Stanley Baker -  Detective Sergeant Jack Truman
 Anne Heywood -  Catherine 'Cathie' Murphy
 David McCallum -  Johnnie Murphy
 Peter Cushing -  Priest
 John Slater - Detective Sergeant Willie Walker
 Clifford Evans -  Heaven
 Moultrie Kelsall -  Superintendent
 George A. Cooper -  Chief Inspector
 Brona Boland -  Mary Murphy
 Fergal Boland -  Patrick Montgomery Murphy
 Michael Chow -  Alexander
 Tsai Chin -  Primrose
 Sean Lynch -  Slick
 Bernice Swanson -  Meg (as Benice Swanson)
 Freddie Starr - Tommy (as Fred Fowell) 
 Sheila Raynor - Mrs. Catlin 
 Christopher Cooke - David Catlin 
 Irene Arnold - Mrs. Baker 
 Oonagh Quinn - Jilly Baker 
 Melvyn Hayes - Kid in Johnnie's Gang (uncredited)

Production 
The film was shot on location in Gerard Gardens in Liverpool, some interior scenes were shot at Pinewood Studios, and the school scenes were shot at St Mary and St Michael School, Sutton Street, Stepney, London E1.

It played throughout Europe on its initial release, but failed to break into the US market, where a glut of similar films was being produced. It was, however, given a US release in the 1960s to cash in on both its Liverpool background, after the city became famous for being the home of The Beatles, and McCallum's global popularity in his role as Illya Kuryakin in The Man from U.N.C.L.E.

Critical reception
In a contemporary review, The Monthly Film Bulletin wrote, "The screenplay is stiff and lifeless, relying on false banter and stagy recrimination scenes," with the reviewer concluding that, "It is very sad that such a wonderful opportunity to make a true to life film on such an important theme has been allowed, once again, to slip away". BFI Screenonline subsequently wrote of the film, "it's hard to deny its rousing effectiveness as a high-powered melodrama". TV Guide noted, "A tautly scripted effort is given a realistic bent through the atmospheric photography and the subtle handling of the children."

References

External links
 
 
 
 Violent Playground at BFI Screenonline

1958 films
1958 drama films
Films directed by Basil Dearden
Films set in Liverpool
Films shot at Pinewood Studios
British drama films
Films shot in Liverpool
1950s English-language films
1950s British films